John Forbes may refer to:

Science

John Forbes (botanist) (1799–1823), English botanist
John Forbes (physician) (1787–1861), Scottish physician
John Ripley Forbes (1913–2006), American naturalist and conservationist

Military

John Forbes (British Army officer) (1707–1759), British general in the French and Indian War
John Forbes (Portuguese general) (1733–1808), Scottish general in the Portuguese service
John Forbes (Royal Navy officer) (1714–1796), British admiral and politician
John Morrison Forbes (1925–2021), British admiral

Religion

John Forbes (friar) (1571–1606), Scottish Capuchin friar
John Forbes (Gaelic scholar) (1818–1863), Scottish minister and Gaelic translator
John Forbes (Alford minister) (c. 1568–1634), Scottish minister exiled by James VI and I
John Forbes (theologian, born 1593) (1593–1648), Scottish theologian; one of the six "Aberdeen doctors"
John Forbes (minister of St Paul's, Glasgow) (1800-25 December 1874) Scottish mathematician and minister

Politics and law

John Forbes (died 1734) (c. 1673–1734), Scottish member of the British Parliament for Inverness-shire, 1715–1722
John Forbes (Iowa politician) (born 1956), Iowa State Representative
John Hay Forbes, Lord Medwyn (1776–1854), Scottish judge
John Murray Forbes (diplomat) (1771–1831), American diplomat
John W. Forbes II, American government official in Virginia

Sports
John Forbes (cricketer) (1931–2017), South African cricketer
John Forbes (footballer) (1862–1928), Scottish footballer
John Forbes (sailor) (born 1970), Australian Olympian sailor

Business
John Forbes and Company, the British firm of John Forbes (1767–1823) and his brother Thomas (†1808), a trading company active in the southeastern United States and India, from 1804 to 1847
John Murray Forbes (1813–1898), American banker and railroad president
John Malcolm Forbes (1847–1904), American businessman, yachtsman and horseman

Other people

John Forbes (architect) (1795?–?), British architect
John Forbes (poet) (1950–1998), Australian poet
John Forbes, 6th Lord Forbes (died 1547), Scottish landowner
John Forbes, 8th Lord Forbes (1542–1606), Scottish aristocrat
John J. Forbes, American mining engineer
John Stuart Hepburn Forbes, Scottish baronet, landowner, advocate and agriculturalist